The Collins Ferry Historic District encompasses two historic farmsteads, as well as a mill and ferry site on the Staunton River in rural northern Halifax County, Virginia, west of Brookneal. The Collins Farm, which is located at the end of McKeever's Trail, includes one of Halifax County's best-preserved Federal style plantation houses, built c. 1810 and located on a bluff overlooking the creek. The Collins Farm includes 19th century farm outbuildings, the family cemetery, a mill site along the river, and the site where stones for the mill's construction and grinding stones were quarried. The Hubbard Farm is located south and east of the Collins Farm, and is accessed via a private drive that forms part of the historic road leading to Collins Ferry. Hubbard Farm includes a Greek Revival farmhouse built in 1856, and also includes 19th century outbuildings, a family cemetery, and the remains of a slave quarters.

The district was listed on the National Register of Historic Places in 2012.

See also
National Register of Historic Places listings in Halifax County, Virginia

References

Historic districts in Halifax County, Virginia
National Register of Historic Places in Halifax County, Virginia
Historic districts on the National Register of Historic Places in Virginia
Slave cabins and quarters in the United States